Donald Cozzens (May 17, 1939 – December 9, 2021) was an American Roman Catholic priest, author, and lecturer.

Biography 
Cozzens was a president-rector and professor of pastoral theology at Saint Mary Seminary and Graduate School of Theology in Wickliffe, Ohio. In his writings, he tackled the themes of priestly celibacy, homosexuality and sexual abuse in the Catholic Church.

Cozzens died from complications of COVID-19 in Mayfield Heights, Ohio, on December 9, 2021, at the age of 82.

Bibliography 
 The Spirituality of the Diocesan Priest, 1997 
 The Changing Face of the Priesthood, 2000 
 Sacred Silence: Denial and the Crisis in the Church, 2002 
 Faith That Dares to Speak, 2004 
 Freeing Celibacy, 2006 
 Master of Ceremonies, 2014 (novel) 
 Under Pain of Mortal Sin, 2018 (novel)

References

1939 births
2021 deaths
American Roman Catholic priests
Deaths from the COVID-19 pandemic in Ohio